The Middle Fork Clearwater River is a short, but high volume river in Idaho County, Idaho, United States and is the major source of the Clearwater River, a tributary of the Snake River.

Description
The Middle Fork's entire length is within Idaho County, although a small portion of its watershed extends into Clearwater County.

The Middle Fork, along with the Selway and Lochsa Rivers, was among the original eight rivers designated as part of the National Wild and Scenic Rivers System. It is a major migration route for Pacific chinook salmon that spawn in the Selway River. Although the Middle Fork flows through a tight canyon, it is characterized by gentle Class I and II rapids suitable for floating, especially in late summer after the peak snow melt has decreased.

U.S. Route 12 follows the entire length of the river.

See also

 List of rivers of Idaho

Notes

References

External links

Rivers of Idaho
Wild and Scenic Rivers of the United States